Vannini is an Italian surname. Notable people with the surname include:

Alessandro Vannini
Elia Vannini (1637-1695): Italian Baroque composer and Carmelite monk
Giuditta Vannini
Marco Vannini (born 1943), Italian biologist
Pietro Vannini (1413/1414–1495/1496), Italian artist and silversmith
Ottavio Vannini (1585– 1643), Italian Baroque painter

See also
Lucilio Vanini

Italian-language surnames